Gervon Dexter Sr. (born October 5, 2001) is an American football defensive tackle for the Florida Gators.

High school career
Dexter attended Lake Wales High School in Lake Wales, Florida. He was selected to the 2020 Under Armour All-American Game. He committed to the University of Florida to play college football.

College career
As a true freshman at Florida in 2020, Dexter played in all 12 games with two starts and had 20 tackles, 0.5 sacks and one interception. As a sophomore in 2021, he started nine of 13 games, recording 50 tackles and 2.5 sacks.

References

External links

Florida Gators bio

Living people
Players of American football from Florida
American football defensive tackles
Florida Gators football players
2001 births